Tala Tappeh (also Romanized as Ţalā Tappeh) is a village in Tala Tappeh Rural District of Nazlu District of Urmia County, West Azerbaijan province, Iran. At the 2006 National Census, its population was 796 in 264 households. The following census in 2011 counted 691 people in 229 households. The latest census in 2016 showed a population of 547 people in 206 households; it was the largest village in its rural district.

References 

Urmia County

Populated places in West Azerbaijan Province

Populated places in Urmia County